In the 2006–07 season Panathinaikos played for 48th consecutive time in Greece's top division, Super League. The club also participated in the Greek Cup and UEFA Cup. The season started with Hans Backe as team manager.

Squad
Updated 24 February 2007.

Transfers

In:

Out:

Team kit

Competitions

Super League Greece

League table

Matches

Greek Cup

Fourth round

Fifth round

Quarter-finals

Semi-finals

Final

UEFA Cup

First round

Group G

Knockout stage

Round of 32

Squad statistics

Appearances and goals

|-
|colspan="14"|Players who appeared for Panathinaikos but left during the season:
|}

Top Scorers

Disciplinary Record

References

External links
 Panathinaikos FC official website

Panathinaikos F.C. seasons
Panathinaikos FC season